Onchosaurus is an extinct genus of sclerorhynchid sawfish from the Late Cretaceous (84.9 to 66.043 million years ago). Its fossils have been found in the Cretaceous sediments of Egypt, Morocco, France, Niger, Japan, Chile, Peru and the United States.

Description
These sclerorhynchiform sawfishes are only known by isolated vertebra and rostral spines. On the basis of fossil findings they are considered large, bottom-dwelling fishes, mainly inhabiting shallow marine habitats, but they were also powerful swimmers.

Species
Species within this genus include:

 Onchosaurus marocanus  Arambourg, 1935
 Onchosaurus pharao  (Dames, 1887) 
 Onchosaurus radicalis  Gervais, 1852

References

Cretaceous cartilaginous fish
Prehistoric cartilaginous fish genera
Cretaceous fish of Europe
Prehistoric fish of Africa
Sclerorhynchidae